Sanjaya is the character from the epic Mahabharata.

Sanjaya may also refer to:
 Sanjaya refers to Daniel of Bible, OT.
 Sanjaya Dynasty, the Javanese dynasty
Sanjaya of Mataram, the founder of the Mataram Kingdom
 Sanjaya Lall, Oxford economist
 Sanjaya Malakar, an American Idol contestant
 Sanjaya Belatthaputta, an ascetic teacher

See also 
 Sanjay (disambiguation)